"A Shot of Rhythm and Blues" is a song written by Terry Thompson and first recorded by US soul singer Arthur Alexander. It was originally released in the United States in 1961 and in the United Kingdom the following year, as the B-side of "You Better Move On".

As well as having Rhythm and Blues in the title, the song is itself an R&B number.  Featuring only blues chords, it begins as an apparent 12-bar blues, but then diverges from that standard structure into a more distinctive composition.

Cover versions
Johnny Kidd & the Pirates released the song as a single in 1962. It features Johnny Kidd on vocals, Mick Green on lead guitar, Johnny Spence on bass and Frank Farley on drums.

The song, along with "Some Other Guy", became a standard on the 1960s Mersey scene, particularly at the Cavern Club, and was covered by Cilla, Sam "T-Bird" Jensen, the Beatles. and Gerry and the Pacemakers.

The Beatles recorded "A Shot of Rhythm and Blues" three times for the BBC in 1963, with John Lennon on lead vocals each time. One of the versions was included on the album Live at the BBC, released in 1994. The critic Robert Christgau called it one the Beatles' greatest covers.

In July 1963, Cilla Black recorded the song during her first ever recording session at Abbey Road Studios. Cilla subsequently passed this audition and signed a recording contract with Parlophone Records. A take from this recording session was included on The Abbey Road Decade: 1963-1973 album, released in 1997.  In the TV series Cilla, "A Shot of Rhythm and Blues" was one of the songs sung by Sheridan Smith.

Dave Edmunds covered the song on his 1975 album Subtle as a Flying Mallet. It was also heard in the Stardust film.

Van Morrison and Linda Gail Lewis performed the song on their 2000 album You Win Again.

The song was also covered by the Flamin' Groovies on their compilation album, Flamin' Groovies Collection.

Buffalo covered it in 1972 under the title "Just a Little Rock and Roll".  It was later released on the Aztec Music remaster of their debut album, Dead Forever....

References

1961 singles
The Beatles songs
Van Morrison songs
1961 songs
Arthur Alexander songs
Dot Records singles